is a railway station in Yamashiro-chō Tachiiwa, Imari City, Saga Prefecture. It is operated by Matsuura Railway and is on the Nishi-Kyūshū Line.

The station is popular with photographers and railfans due to an abundance of cherry blossoms surrounding the station, which creates a picturesque setting during their blooming period.

Lines
Matsuura Railway
Nishi-Kyūshū Line

Adjacent stations

Station layout
The station is ground level with a single side platform.

Environs
National Route 204
Ruins of Kawanami Shipyard
Uranosaki Post Office

History
October 1, 1930 - Opens for business.
April 1, 1987 - Railways privatize and this station is inherited by JR Kyushu.
April 1, 1988 - This station is inherited by Matsuura Railway.

References
Nagasaki statistical yearbook (Nagasaki prefectural office statistics section,Japanese)

External links
Matsuura Railway (Japanese)

Railway stations in Japan opened in 1930
Railway stations in Saga Prefecture